Regurgitate was a Swedish goregrind band that included members from both Stockholm and Mjölby. The band formed in 1990 and ended in 2009, and released four full-length albums. They were one of the most notable practitioners in the goregrind genre, with their most famous album being Carnivorous Erection (2000).

Tribute 
In 2001, Bizarre Leprous Productions released a 46-band tribute to Regurgitate entitled Comeback of Goregods: Tribute to Regurgitate, with bands such as Inhume, Last Days of Humanity, Lymphatic Phlegm, Gore Beyond Necropsy, Haemorrhage, and Neurovisceral Exhumation taking part.

Band members

Final lineup 
Rikard Jansson – vocals (1990–2009) bass (1992–1994)
Urban "Ubbe" Skytt – guitar (1993–2009)
Jocke Pettersson – drums (1999–2009)
Johan Jansson – bass (2006–2009)

Former members 
Johan "Joppe" Hanson – bass (1990–1998)
Mats Nordrup – drums, guitar (1990–1993)
Peter Stjärnvind – drums (1993–1998)
Glenn Sykes – bass (2002–2006) vocals (2002–2003)

Discography

Full-length albums and EPs 
 1994 – Effortless Regurgitation of Bright Red Blood (Lowland Records)
 2000 – Carnivorous Erection (Relapse Records/Morbid Records)
 2002 – Hatefilled Vengeance (Relapse Records)
 2003 – Deviant (Relapse Records)
 2006 – Sickening Bliss (Relapse Records)

Demos and promos 
 1991 – Demo 91
 1994 – Concrete Human Torture
 1999 – Promo CD 1999

Splits 
 1992 – Split with Vaginal Massaker (Poserslaughter Records)
 1993 – Split with Psychotic Noise (Glued Stamps Records)
 1994 – Split with Grudge (Obliteration Records)
 1994 – Split with Dead (Poserslaughter Records)
 1996 – Flesh Mangler Split with Intestinal Infection (Noise Variations)
 2000 – Split with Filth (Panic Records)
 2001 – Sodomy and Carnal Assault Split with Gore Beyond Necropsy (No Weak Shit Records)
 2001 – Scream Bloody Whore Split with Realized (Stuhlgang Records)
 2002 – Split with Cripple Bastards (E.U.'91 Produzioni)
 2003 – Bonesplicer Split with Entrails Massacre (Towerviolence Records)
 2003 – Corruptured Split with Noisear (Regurgitated Semen Records)
 2003 – 3-Way Live  Split with Entrails Massacre and Suppository (Blastwork Records)
 2003 – Bonesplicer/Baltic Thrash Corps Split 5" with Entrails Massacre
 2004 – Split with Suppository (Badger Records)
 2008 – Split with Skullhog
 2009 – Split with Dead Infection

References

External links 
 
 Regurgitate at Relapse Records
 [ Regurgitate] at AllMusic

Goregrind musical groups
Grindcore musical groups
Relapse Records artists
Swedish heavy metal musical groups
Musical groups established in 1990
Musical groups disestablished in 2009